Kuwait Television is Kuwait's official state-run television station, and part of the Kuwaiti Ministry of information.

Kuwait Television has 9 channels and a satellite channel: KTV1, KTV2, KTV Sport, KTV Sport Plus, KTV Kids, alQurain channel, Al Araby Channel, Ethraa Channel and almajles channel.

History

Early history
Kuwait Television began broadcasting on 15 November 1961, from the eastern district of Kuwait City. It was the second TV station on the Arabian peninsula (after Iraq TV), initially broadcasting in black and white for four hours a day. started color television using the PAL system in March 1974, for the first ever round of the Gulf Cup of Nations, from Bahrain.

Early broadcasters included Salem Al-Fahd, Reza Faili and Jassim Al-Shehab.

KTV1

KTV1 launched on April 7, 1992, with 24-hour broadcasting. By 1997, the channel was broadcasting Kuwaiti-produced programmes around the world. KTV1 is a state run channel. Its programming cycle changes approximately every three months, and shows special content during the month of Ramadan. Daily programs on the channel include Good Morning Kuwait, Baitak, and Good Evening. Also included in the broadcasts are a variety of cultural and religious programs, and coverage of state events.

KTV2

KTV2 is the only one of the state run channels to broadcast in English. It shows English programs and Arabic programs that have been dubbed in English, showing family centered local programming. The channel's stated mission is to promote Kuwait's media abroad, to show foreign viewers something of Kuwaiti culture and news, and to foster relationships between the State, the Kuwaiti public, and English speakers in Kuwait.

KTV Sport

KTV Sport began broadcasting on November 1, 1993. Initially chaired by Mohammed Al Zamel, this channel was considered at the time to be the leading sports channel in the Arabic Gulf region. It was originally a local sports channel, but in 2002, KTV Sport replaced their ground transmission with satellite transmission, enabling them to broadcast international sporting events as well.

Al Araby Channel

Al Araby was launched on February 25, 2009, under the direction of the former Minister of Information, Sheikh Sabah Al Khalid Al Sabah. Its programming includes literary, cultural, scientific, and artistic based shows, and it also covers important cultural events. The Al Araby channel coordinates with KTV1 when covering national events.

Ethra's Channel

Ethra's Channel is dedicated to religious programmes that educate viewers about Islam, Islamic principles, and Islam's spiritual value. It coordinates with the Kuwait Ministry of Awqaf and Islamic Affairs, as well as with the Awqaf Public Foundation to produce information that supports mainstream Islam, rather than extremist ideologies.  The channel also covers religious events in Kuwait.

External links
 Official Website

References 

Arabic-language television stations
Mass media in Kuwait
Television channels and stations established in 1961
Television in Kuwait